Leilani Jones Wilmore (born May 14, 1957) is an American actress.

Life and career
Jones was born in Oahu, Hawaii. She originated the role of Chiffon at the WPA Theater in the original cast of Little Shop of Horrors. Marlene Danielle replaced her for a few weeks when the show opened Off Broadway at the Orpheum Theater. Jones resumed her role at that time and played the part for three more years. Jones also recorded the role on the original cast recording. Jones next went on to play the role of Satin, a stripper at a Chicago burlesque house, in the original Broadway production of Grind. Jones won a Tony as Best Featured Actress in a Musical and a Drama Desk Award for her performance.

After leaving Grind, Jones married writer, actor and television producer Larry Wilmore and her career slowed down considerably, as she appeared only in small roles in a few movies and television shows and did voice over work for video games, most notably portraying the voice performance of the Voodoo Lady in the popular video games series of Monkey Island, the voice of the computer in Where in the World Is Carmen Sandiego?, as well as serving as the narrator for the descriptive video service sections for various television shows and films. In 2005, Jones reprised her role of Chiffon in New York at a Broadway Cares/Equity Fights AIDS fundraiser. Jones currently lives in San Marino, California with her two children. She and Wilmore divorced during his move to New York to become a host on Comedy Central.

Filmography

Film

Television

Video Games

Discography
 Little Shop of Horrors: Original Cast Album, 1982 Decca U.S. Label
 Grind: Original Broadway Cast, 1985 on the LP Record Label

References

External links
 
 

1957 births
Actresses from Hawaii
American stage actresses
American television actresses
American video game actresses
Drama Desk Award winners
Living people
Native Hawaiian actresses
People from Oahu
Tony Award winners
People from San Marino, California
21st-century American actresses
20th-century American actresses